Chairat Madsiri (born September 29, 1982) is a retired professional footballer from Thailand.

References

External links
 Chairat-Madsiri# Goal.com  
 Players Profile - info.thscore.com
 

1982 births
Living people
Chairat Madsiri
Chairat Madsiri
Association football midfielders
Chairat Madsiri
Chairat Madsiri
Chairat Madsiri
Chairat Madsiri